Isabel Cargill (10 December 1864 – 17 April 1944) was a New Zealand businesswoman who established English-style tearooms in Rome, Italy, in the early 1890s.

Biography
Cargill was born in Dunedin, New Zealand, on 10 December 1864. She was the granddaughter of William Cargill, the founder of the city, and the fourth daughter of Edward Cargill and his wife, Dorothy Cargill (née Nesham).

In the early 1890s she travelled to England and then, with her English friend Anna Maria Babington, to Italy. When they were unable to find a shop selling cups of tea in the city, the pair decided to open an English-style tearooms, which they called Babington's Tea Room. 

Cargill also wrote a column, "Letters from Rome" for the Otago Witness newspaper.

In 1902, Cargill married an Italian artist, Giuseppe da Pozzo. The couple had one daughter, Dorothy, who was born in 1904.

Cargill died in Stra, Veneto, Italy, on 17 April 1944.

References

20th-century New Zealand businesswomen
20th-century New Zealand businesspeople
New Zealand emigrants to Italy
1864 births
1944 deaths
People from Dunedin
Isabel Cargill
New Zealand columnists